Archibald Colquhoun may refer to:
 Archibald Colquhoun (politician), Scottish politician and lawyer
 Archibald Colquhoun (translator), translator of modern Italian literature into English
 Archibald R. Colquhoun, British explorer